This is a list of Billboard magazine's Top Hot 100 songs of 1989.

See also
1989 in music
List of Billboard Hot 100 number-one singles of 1989
List of Billboard Hot 100 top-ten singles in 1989

References

1989 record charts
Billboard charts